Eugène Louis Hatin (8 September 1809 – 16 September 1893) was a 19th-century French historian, journalist and bibliographer.

Biography 
Hatin was educated at the college of his native city and then went to Paris where he devoted himself to various anonymous work of library, while filling the position of proofreader.

The first books he published, on subjects of history and geography, had only a mediocre success and would certainly not have been enough to make his name remembered. In 1846 he published his first work on journalism. His extensive work  Histoire politique et littéraire de la presse en France was considered to have no equivalent abroad. His Bibliographie de la presse is a valuable collection abondant with curious information.

Hatin also collaborated with the Dictionnaire des Dates, the Histoire des villes de France, the Complément de l’Encyclopédie du XIXe, etc., and created the first political newspaper to five centimes la Seine and, in 1854, the périodical l’Union littéraire later renamed Bulletin des sociétés savantes.

Eugène Hatin was made a chevalier of the Légion d’honneur in 1867.

Works 
 Histoire pittoresque de l’Algérie (1840, in-8°) ;
 La Loire et, ses bords, guide pittoresque (1843, in-18) ;
 Histoire pittoresque des voyages dans les cinq parties du monde (1843–47, 5 vol. in-8) ;
 Histoire du journal en France (1631-1846) (1846, in-16, 2nd edition, significantly developed and continued until 1853, in-16) ;
 Histoire politique et littéraire de la presse en France (1859-1861), 8 vol. in-8 ou 8 vol. in-12 ;
 Les Gazettes de Hollande et la presse clandestine aux XVlle et XVIlle, (1865, in-8) ;
 La Presse périodique dans les deux mondes; essai historique et statistique sur les origines du journal (1866, in-8°) ;
 Bibliographie historique et critique de la presse périodique française (1860, in-8°) ;
 Manuel théorique et pratique de la liberté de la presse. Histoire, législation, doctrine et jurisprudence (1868, 2 vol. in-8°) ;
 Le Journal (1881, in-32) ;
 Théophraste Renaudot et ses innocentes inventions (1883, in-12) ;
 À propos de Théophraste Renaudot. L’histoire, la fantaisie et la fatalité (1884, in-8°) ;
 La Maison du Grand-Coq et le Bureau d’adresses, berceau de notre premier journal (1885, in-12).

Sources 
 Polybiblion, Revue bibliographique universelle, Paris, Aux bureaux du Polybiblion, 1893.
 Adolphe Bitard, Dictionnaire général de biographie contemporaine française et étrangère, Paris, Maurice Dreyfous, 1878, (p. 635).

External links 
 Eugène Hatin on data.bnf.fr
 Eugène Hatin on wikisource

19th-century French historians
19th-century French journalists
French male journalists
French bibliographers
Chevaliers of the Légion d'honneur
People from Auxerre
1809 births
1893 deaths
19th-century French male writers